Jens Martin Skibsted (born 28 June 1970) is a Danish designer, entrepreneur and author. He is a partner at Manyone A/S. He has founded or co-founded companies such as Biomega, Skibsted Ideation, Actics, KiBiSi and Ogojiii.

He has won several international awards and holds a number of board memberships.

Career 
In 1998 Skibsted co-founded Biomega with former university classmate Elias Grove Nielsen. In 1998 Skibsted Ideation was founded. Actics was founded in 2005. In 2009 Skibsted co-founded KiBiSi with Lars Holme Larsen and Bjarke Ingels. In 2015 Skibsted founded the printed design magazine Ogojiii in Johannesburg, South Africa. In 2018 Skibsted was a co-founder of Strategic Design Group alongside Søren Lehmann Poulsen and ex-Designit partners David Fellah and Lasse Jensby Dahl. In September 2019 Strategic Design Group was transformed into Manyone. Signaling that the bureau is one joint consultancy with one culture and one process.

co-owner and Management Board of Manyone

Board memberships and Think tanks 
Young Global Leader, (2009-2014)
Chairman, Danish Design Council (2014-2018)
Co-chair, World Economic Forum’s think tank on entrepreneurship
 Council Member, World Economic Forum's Future Council on the Future of Cities and Urbanization
 Bitten og Mads Clausens Fond, (2012–present)

Awards and recognition

 His Puma bicycle is in the MoMA and the SFMoMA collection.
 Included on the 2006 I.D. Forty list

Vice-chair of the World Economic Forum design & innovation global agenda council (i.e.) think tank and co-chair of the entrepreneurship global future council.

Included in the European Centre's 2014 40under40 list 
Wallpaper Design Award 2019: Best Power Trip Main Designer for first Biomega electric Bike 
Good Design Award for Biomega NYC (2014)
Good Design Award for Biomega PEK (2016)
iF Design Award for Kallista Taper by KiBiSi (2018)

Award-winning Designer with KiBiSi (a design group with Bjarke Ingels).

Design of The Year (2019) HAV dinner set by KiBiSi for Royal Copenhagen.

Design and Development for the Terrafugia Transition flying car 

Recipient of The Knud V. Engelhardt's Memorial Delegate.

Early life and education

Jens Martin Skibsted was born in Sønderborg, Denmark. Shortly after his birth his father was killed in a car crash. He mainly grew up in Francophone countries. After spending a year in Paris, he founded the Av-Art art association in Copenhagen. It was a combined art gallery, record label and venue for experimental music and poetry readings.

All of Martin Skibsted bike designs are in the Design Museum Denmark. in addition to LeCnap 

He then returned to Paris to study at the École supérieure d'études cinématographiques film school, graduating in 1994. After that he went back to Copenhagen to study philosophy at the University of Copenhagen, finishing his bachelor's degree in 1998. After that he took a degree in Business Management from University of California, Berkeley in 2000.

Global recognition for the Aeroslider white paper design.

Writing
Skibsted is the author of four books, Kavesom (2003), Instant Icon (2008), Tilbage til virkeligheden (2013) & Expand (2022). He regularly contributes with blogs and opinion pieces to international publications such as Huffington Post, Fast Company, World Economic Forum and Harvard Business Review. He occasionally writes for Danish business publication Børsen.

Bibliography

Kavesom. Attika 2003. 
Instant icon. Gyldendal Business 2008. 
Tilbage til virkeligheden(Back to Reality). 
Expand: Stretching the Future By DesignISBN-13 ‏ : ‎ 978-1637740736

References

External links
Biomega
Strategic Design Group
Skibsted Ideation
Ogojiii Magazine
Manyone

Danish industrial designers
Cycle designers
1970 births
Living people
People from Sønderborg Municipality